Siror (Siror in local dialect) was a comune (municipality) in Trentino in the northern Italian region Trentino-Alto Adige/Südtirol, located about  east of Trento. It was merged with Fiera di Primiero, Tonadico and Transacqua on January 1, 2016, to form a new municipality, Primiero San Martino di Castrozza.

The municipality of Siror contains the frazioni (subdivisions) Nolesca and part of San Martino di Castrozza.

Siror borders the following municipalities: Canale d'Agordo, Predazzo, Canal San Bovo, Mezzano, Imer, Tonadico and Transacqua.

Demographic evolution

References

Cities and towns in Trentino-Alto Adige/Südtirol